Martin Garcia may refer to:

People
 Martín García (footballer, born 1976), Uruguayan footballer
 Martín García (footballer, born 1981), Colombian footballer
 Martín García (footballer, born 1998), Argentine footballer
 Martin Garcia (jockey) (born 1984), Mexican-born jockey in American horse racing
 Martín García (tennis) (born 1977), Argentine tennis player
 Martín García Óñez de Loyola (1549–1598), Spanish Basque soldier and Royal Governor of Chile
 Fernando Martín García, Puerto Rican politician
 Martín García (Peruvian footballer)
 Martín García García, Spanish pianist

Places
 Martín García Island, island in the Río de la Plata, Argentina
 Martín García Island Airport

Other uses
 Battle of Martín García (1814), a naval battle in the Argentine War of Independence
 Martín García canal dispute

Garcia, Martin